Gyan  Sudha Misra is a former Judge of the Supreme Court of India. Misra was elevated as a Judge of the Supreme Court of India on 30 April 2010. She has passed several landmarks and notable judgments in the Supreme Court of India including judgments on conflict of interest in the Srinivasan-BCCI matter, landmark euthanasia judgment - Aruna shaunbaug matter, and most recently the Delhi Uphaar fire tragedy dissenting judgment holding the management liable for colossal loss of human lives and directing them to pay heavy compensation to be used for social causes like building trauma centre.

Misra enrolled as an advocate in the Bihar State Bar Council in 1972 at a time when the legal profession for women in India was rather uncommon and the profession was primarily considered to be a male bastion. 
Prior to her appointment as a Judge, Misra was also actively associated with the activities of the lawyers and the legal profession and hence was elected as a Treasurer, Joint Secretary, and Member Executive Committee of the Supreme Court Bar Association, several times, which is the premier association of lawyers in the country.

High Court judge
In recognition of her services and standing as a lawyer for more than 21 years she was appointed a Judge of the Patna High Court in the State of Bihar on 16 March 1994 but soon thereafter was transferred to the High Court of Rajasthan State in view of the then prevailing transfer policy of judges in the Indian Judiciary. While functioning as a judge in the Rajasthan High Court, she held several important assignments as Company Judge, Judge for Arbitration matters, Constitutional matters and was also appointed and continued as chairman of the Advisory Board constituted under the National Security Act. She also chaired as a member of the selection committee constituted for the appointment of Civil Judge (Junior and Senior Division). She was later appointed Executive Chairman of the Rajasthan State Legal Services Authority, which is a statutory body assigned with the duty of administering legal aid and assistance to the disadvantaged sections of society and also for taking effective and statutory steps for reduction of arrears in the State judiciary. In this capacity, she also worked effectively for checking the social problems which included the effective implementation of measures for checking the incidence of child marriages, female foeticide, exploitation of women and children in various forms, and a large number of such other social atrocities.

Misra had also been invited to participate in the South Asian Conference on the invitation of the UNICEF held at Kathmandu (Nepal) on the subject of "Ending Violence against the Women and Children". 
In 1998 she also represented India, as a guest speaker, in the Conference of the International Association of Women Judges held at Ottawa in Canada where a variety of issues relating to women and children in the world at large were the subject matter of discussion and deliberations.

Chief Justice of Jharkhand High Court
After 14 years of successful tenure as a judge of the Rajasthan High Court, Misra was elevated as Chief Justice of the Jharkhand High Court at Ranchi in the State of Jharkhand on 13 July 2008 and functioned in that capacity till 29 April 2010.

As Chief Justice of the Jharkhand High Court, while hearing PIL matters, Misra passed a large number of prominent and effective orders, which resulted in the initiation of a probe by the Enforcement Directorate against eminent persons involving significant financial implications. In one of the PIL matters while relying upon the judgment of the Supreme Court in the case of St. Mary's School, New Delhi vs Election Commission of India, the bench presided over by Misra ruled that the school building and the school buses would not be utilized during the elections on any working day as it upsets the routine studies and also hinders the school's administrative work. Treating a letter from Tapasi Choudhary to be a PIL relating to the sensitive matter of the mysterious death of her daughter Mousami Choudhary, a trainee air hostess of AHA Airhostess Training Institute, Jamshedpur at Hotel Sonnet of Jamshedpur, Misra sitting in a division bench with justice D.K. Sinha directed a CBI probe into the matter and for filing charge-sheet.

As Chief Justice of the Jharkhand High Court, Misra was invited to be a member of the Indian delegation, headed by the Chief Justice of India along with other judges, which visited Australia to participate in the Conference for "Protecting Rights and Promoting Access to Justice" project held between 18–27 September 2009.

While working as a judge, Misra has demonstrated through her judgments and orders that she is a strong believer in the principle that social justice, which is one of the objectives of the Indian Constitution certainly helps us in bringing about a just society by removing imbalances in social, educational, economic and political life of the people and protecting the rights of the weak, aged, destitute, women, children and other under-privileged persons of the state against the ruthless treatment which is enshrined in the preamble to the constitution.

References

1949 births
Living people
Place of birth missing (living people)
Judges of the Patna High Court
Justices of the Supreme Court of India
Judges of the Rajasthan High Court
Chief Justices of the Jharkhand High Court
Women educators from Bihar
Educators from Bihar
20th-century Indian judges
20th-century Indian women judges
21st-century Indian judges
21st-century Indian women judges